Samarkand International Airport  is an airport of entry in Samarkand, Uzbekistan, 6 km (3.7 mi) from the city center. The airport is operated by Uzbekistan Airways since the creation of the airline in 1992. The airport has domestic as well as international flights.

Current 
Samarkand International Airport was renovated several years ago. It is one of the busiest airports in Uzbekistan.

Airlines and destinations

See also
 List of the busiest airports in the former USSR
 Transportation in Uzbekistan

References

External links

Airports in Uzbekistan
Buildings and structures in Samarkand